The Social Protection People's Party, initially known as the Party of Pensioners and Social Protection, was a minor center-left political party in Romania, claiming to represent the interests of pensioners, the unemployed, and other vulnerable social classes. It merged into the National Union for the Progress of Romania in December 2011.

References

Political parties established in 1994
Political parties disestablished in 2011
Defunct political parties in Romania
Defunct liberal political parties
1994 establishments in Romania
2011 disestablishments in Romania